The 1979–80 CHL season was the 17th season of the Central Hockey League, a North American minor professional league. Nine teams participated in the regular season, and the Salt Lake Golden Eagles won the league title.

Regular season

Playoffs

First round 
 (1) Salt Lake Golden Eagles – (6) Houston Apollos 4:2
 (2) Indianapolis Checkers – (5) Tulsa Oilers 3:0
 (3) Fort Worth Texans – (4) Birmingham Bulls 3:1

Second round 
 (1) Bye for Salt Lake Golden Eagles
 (2) Indianapolis Checkers (3) – Fort Worth Texans 1:3

Final
 (1) Salt Lake Golden Eagles – (3) Fort Worth Texans 4:3

External links
 Statistics on hockeydb.com

CPHL
Central Professional Hockey League seasons